The 1923–24 Trinity Blue Devils men's basketball team represented Trinity College (later renamed Duke University) during the 1923–24 men's college basketball season. The head coach was Jessie Burbage, coaching his second and final season with the Blue Devils. The team finished with an overall record of 19–6.

References 

Duke Blue Devils men's basketball seasons
Duke
1923 in sports in North Carolina
1924 in sports in North Carolina